Zimnicea High School is a high school located in central Zimnicea, Teleorman County, Romania. Its current building opened in December 1977, the previous location having been destroyed in the March earthquake. It was built with funds from the government of Switzerland.

External links
 Official site

Schools in Teleorman County
High schools in Romania
1977 establishments in Romania